The 1980 Tour de Romandie was the 34th edition of the Tour de Romandie cycle race and was held from 6 May to 11 May 1980. The race started in Meyrin and finished in Fribourg. The race was won by Bernard Hinault of the Renault team.

General classification

References

1980
Tour de Romandie
Tour de Romandie
1980 Super Prestige Pernod